Merel Didi van Dongen (born 11 February 1993) is a Dutch professional footballer who plays as a defender for Spanish Primera División club Atlético Madrid and the Netherlands women's national team.

Club career
She played for Ter Leede and ADO Den Haag before going to the United States where she played for Alabama Crimson Tide. She returned to the Netherlands in 2015 and signed with AFC Ajax.

College career

In Van Dongen's two years at Alabama she managed to become the Tide's single season assists leader registering 10 in 2014. She is No. 1 on Alabama's career assists per game list with 0.30 through 44 games, and her 10 assists in 2014 allowed her to take the No. 1 spot on the single season assists per game list with 0.53 through 19 games. Van Dongen converted four penalty kicks during her career with Alabama, which ranks fourth on the career penalty kicks made list.

In her last season with the Crimson Tide, she was selected to the CoSIDA/Capital One Academic All-American team and All-District 4 First Team and named a member of the All-SEC Second Team.

International career

As a junior international she played the 2010 and 2011 U-19 European Championships.

Van Dongen made her senior Netherlands women's national football team debut in a 7–0 friendly win over Thailand on 7 February 2015. She was one of the last three players to be cut from national team coach Roger Reijners' final squad for UEFA Women's Euro 2013 in Sweden. When Mandy van den Berg subsequently suffered knee ligament damage, Van Dongen was called up as a late replacement. She was also part of the Dutch squad at the 2015 FIFA Women's World Cup.

International goals
Scores and results list the Netherlands goal tally first.

Personal life
She is in a relationship with Ana Romero. They are engaged since December 2021.

Honours

Club

ADO Den Haag
 Eredivisie (1): 2011–12
 KNVB Women's Cup (1): 2011–12

Ajax
 Eredivisie (2): 2016–17 2017-2018
 KNVB Women's Cup (2): 2016–17 2017-18

International
 Algarve Cup: 2018
 FIFA Women's World Cup runners-up: 2019

References

External links
Profile at Onsoranje.nl (in Dutch)
Profile at vrouwenvoetbalnederland.nl (in Dutch)
Profile at uefa.com
Profile at University of Alabama

1993 births
Living people
Dutch women's footballers
Expatriate women's footballers in Spain
Netherlands women's international footballers
Expatriate women's soccer players in the United States
Footballers from Amsterdam
2015 FIFA Women's World Cup players
Women's association football midfielders
Van Dongen, Merel
AFC Ajax (women) players
ADO Den Haag (women) players
Eredivisie (women) players
2019 FIFA Women's World Cup players
Dutch LGBT sportspeople
LGBT association football players
Lesbian sportswomen
Real Betis Féminas players
Dutch expatriate sportspeople in Spain
Dutch expatriate women's footballers
Ter Leede players
Footballers at the 2020 Summer Olympics
Olympic footballers of the Netherlands
Atlético Madrid Femenino players
UEFA Women's Euro 2022 players